A. nepalensis may refer to:

 Aborolabis nepalensis, an earwig with unsegmented cerci
 Acanthocalyx nepalensis, a plant native to China
 Adonis nepalensis, an Old World plant
 Agrilus nepalensis, a jewel beetle
 Alhagi nepalensis, a manna tree
 Alnus nepalensis, an alder tree
 Amara nepalensis, a sun beetle
 Amaranthus nepalensis, an annual plant
 Anchista nepalensis, synonym for Anchista fenestrata, a ground beetle
 Ancistria nepalensis, a parasitic flat bark beetle
 Anguliphantes nepalensis, a sheet weaver
 Antrocephalus nepalensis, a thallose liverwort
 Aparupa nepalensis, a ground beetle
 Arctodiaptomus nepalensis, a pelagic copepod
 Arcyria nepalensis, a slime mold
 Arundinella nepalensis, a true grass
 Asymblepharus nepalensis, a scaled reptile
 Attagenus nepalensis, a skin beetle
 Attheyella nepalensis, a benthic copepod